Yalchino (Yalsı) is a rural locality (a village) and the administrative centre of Yalchinsky Selsoviet, Kugarchinsky District, Bashkortostan, Russia. The population was 222 as of 2010.

Geography 
It is located 52 km from Mrakovo.

References 

Rural localities in Kugarchinsky District